Diplogramma is a lichenized genus of fungi in the family Roccellaceae. This is a monotypic genus, containing the single species Diplogramma australiensis.

References

Roccellaceae
Lichen genera
Monotypic Ascomycota genera
Taxa named by Johannes Müller Argoviensis
Taxa described in 1891